Waban (16041685) was a Native American of the Nipmuc group and was thought to be the first Native American convert to Christianity in Massachusetts.

Life

Waban was born about 1604 at Musketaquid, near the present town of Concord. While there is no proof that he actually did so, it is believed that his conversion to Christianity came on October 28, 1646 (Julian calendar), when the missionary Reverend John Eliot preached his first sermon to  Native Americans in their own language in Waban's large wigwam in Nonantum, Massachusetts, and Waban and many of his tribe listened but were later forced at gunpoint to move from their land.

Waban maintained close and friendly relations with the white settlers of Massachusetts and, in April 1675, reported to a New England magistrate that trouble was brewing amongst the Wampanoags. Within two months, Waban's predictions came to pass when a Wampanoag named Metacomet, known as "King Philip", led his nation in the initially successful King Philip's War. Metacomet's subsequent death in August 1676 signalled the end of the brief war, and the rebellion soon collapsed due to a lack of leadership. Nevertheless, Waban, falsely accused of being a conspirator, was imprisoned in October 1675. After a brief period of captivity, Waban was released in the spring of 1676 and returned to his settlement of Natick, Massachusetts.

Waban is often considered to be tribal chief of the Nonantum tribe, but this is a misnomer. According to John Eliot, Waban was actually "the chief minister of justice", not a "sachem", but the title "chief minister of justice" is not used by Native Americans. In reality, Waban did not hold an authoritative, political position within his own nation.

The exact date of Waban's death is not known, with it being reported as early as late 1676 or early 1677 and as late as  when Rev. Daniel Takawambait wrote down and published the final words  of Waban and several other Indians in a pamphlet entitled "Dying Speeches and Counsels Of such Indians as dyed in the Lord."

Namesakes
One of the villages of the city of Newton, Massachusetts, is  named Waban, while Nonantum is another village in the city.

A lake in Wellesley, Massachusetts, partially on the grounds of Wellesley College, is named Lake Waban.  

Waban Hill is a geologic feature in the village of Chestnut Hill, Massachusetts, in the eastern part of Newton, Massachusetts.

One U.S. Navy ship, USS Waban, a steamer in commission from 1898 to 1919, has been named for Waban, and kept the name (as SS Waban) while in post-Navy mercantile service from 1919 to 1924.

See also
 Praying Indian
 Waban (MBTA station)
 Waban, Massachusetts
 USS Waban (1880)

Notes

References
Jennings, Francis. The Invasion of America: Indians, Colonialism and the Cant of Conquest. New York: W.W. Norton, 1975.
Tinker, George (Tink). Missionary Conquest: The Gospel and Native American Cultural Genocide. Minneapolis: Fortress Press, 1993.
U.S. Naval Historical Center, Dictionary of American Naval Fighting Ships: USS Waban (ship namesake information)

External links
Praying Indians
Waban, the Wind, by Arthur M. Southwick

Converts to Protestantism from pagan religions
Native American leaders
Newton, Massachusetts
People of colonial Massachusetts
1600s births
1680s deaths
People from Middlesex County, Massachusetts
Massachusett people
Native American history of Massachusetts
Native American people from Massachusetts